The Brotherhood of Saint Mark (Marx brothers)  was the name of the most important organization of German swordsmen in the 16th century.

History
The brotherhood originated in the 15th century, but it is not known when exactly it was founded. Hans Talhoffer may have been an early member, or even one of the founders (the lion of St Mark appears in his coat of arms in a manuscript of 1459). The earliest certain attestation dates to 1474. The group held an annual meeting in Frankfurt, where they elected their captain (Hauptmann). In 1487, Frederick III granted them the monopoly on the title "master of the long sword" (Meister des langen Schwerts), effectively making them a fencers' guild. This title was relevant for the Landsknechts, because a certified "master of the long sword" wielding the Zweihänder was entitled to twice the pay of a normal soldier (Doppelsöldner).

The earliest reference to the brotherhood calls them the brotherhood of Our dear lady and pure Virgin Mary and the Holy and warlike heavenly prince Saint Mark. After their recognition by Frederick, the brotherhood was usually referred to as "Marxbrüder", "Bruderschaft des heiligen Marren" or "Bruderschaft des St. Markus" ("Marx brothers", "Brotherhood of St. Mark").

Anton Rast (captain in 1522) was a known member of the brotherhood. Woodcuts, some of them by Albrecht Dürer, and other references, show that more than just rapier use was taught by the Marxbrüder. They also taught the use of the Zweihänder (as mentioned above), the dussack, the spear, the quarterstaff and the longsword. The dussack, being primarily a practice weapon, was used to train the real-life use of single-edged swords like the langes Messer.

A second fencing brotherhood, the Federfechter, was founded in Prague in 1570, and recognized by the city of Frankfurt, in spite of protests by the Marx brothers, in 1575. From 1607 the two societies shared equal privileges, as in that year, the Federfechter received their first letter of privilege from Rudolph II, the Holy Roman Emperor.

A third guild may have been Lukasbrüder (brotherhood of Saint Luke). They had no official recognition, however, and were probably closer to a society of hooligans than to a proper guild.

Important centers of 16th century martial arts in Germany were Frankfurt, Augsburg and Nuremberg.

See also
Paulus Hector Mair

External links
 http://www.swordhistory.com/excerpts/marx.html
 http://jan.ucc.nau.edu/~wew/fencing/german.html
 https://web.archive.org/web/20050412012652/http://www.georgehernandez.com/xMartialArts/Blades/SwordHistory.htm
 https://web.archive.org/web/20091229123531/http://www.marxbruder.com/

References
 Secret History of the Sword, by J Christopher Amberger
 Schools and Masters of Fence, by Edgerton Castle
 The History of Fencing:  Foundations of Modern European Swordplay, by William Gaugler

Historical European martial arts
15th-century establishments in the Holy Roman Empire
Historical fencing